The 2011–12 Montreal Canadiens season was the team's 103rd season in franchise history and their 95th season in the National Hockey League (NHL) since the league was established on November 22, 1917. Finishing in last place in their respective division and conference, the Canadiens did not qualify for the 2012 Stanley Cup playoffs.

Off-season
Heading into the off-season, Canadiens general manager Pierre Gauthier had certain issues to address. There were several unrestricted free agents on the team that included, most notably Jeff Halpern, Roman Hamrlik, Alex Auld, Brent Sopel, Hal Gill, James Wisniewski, Mathieu Darche and Andrei Markov.

The team managed to re-sign Gill, Darche and Markov. On the other hand, no contracts were offered to Halpern, Auld and Sopel, thus allowing them to leave the team. Roman Hamrlik rejected the Canadiens's one-year offer and instead accepted a two-year contract with the Washington Capitals. James Wisniewski let it be known that he would be testing the free agent market (where a bidding war for his services would ensue). On June 29, his negotiating rights were traded to the Columbus Blue Jackets.

On the restricted free agent side, qualifying offers were made to Andrei Kostitsyn, Max Pacioretty, David Desharnais, Yannick Weber, Ryan White and Josh Gorges, and all were eventually re-signed. No qualifying offers were made to forwards Dustin Boyd, Tom Pyatt, Benoit Pouliot and defenceman Alexandre Picard, thus allowing them to become unrestricted free agents.

On the first day of free agency on July 1, Pierre Gauthier addressed two needs – a big-body forward and a reliable back-up goaltender. They were successful in their first objective in the signing of forward Erik Cole from the Carolina Hurricanes to a four-year, $18 million contract. Their need for a capable back-up goaltender to periodically relieve Carey Price was also fulfilled when they signed free agent Peter Budaj from the Colorado Avalanche to a two-year deal worth $2.3 million.

Another notable transaction during the off-season was the signing of rugged Russian defenceman Alexei Emelin to a one-year, two-way contract for the 2011–12 season. Emelin, drafted by the Canadiens in the third round with the 84th overall pick in the 2004 NHL Entry Draft, was under the Canadiens' radar for quite some time. He finally agreed to make the jump to North America when a clause was inserted in his contract, stating that he would be able to return to the Kontinental Hockey League (KHL) in Russia should he be unable to make the Canadiens' NHL roster. Emelin is often compared to fellow Russian and former NHL defenceman Darius Kasparaitis, who was known for his aggressive, physical playing style.

Assistant Coach Kirk Muller, who was part of the Canadiens' coaching staff since 2006, confirmed rumours that he was actively seeking a head coaching position in the NHL and would be leaving the team. On June 27, 2011, following his inability to find a head coaching position in the NHL, the Nashville Predators announced that Muller had been hired as the head coach of their American Hockey League (AHL) affiliate, the Milwaukee Admirals. He would later fulfill his dream when on November 28, 2011, Muller became coach of the Carolina Hurricanes, taking over for Paul Maurice.

Following Muller's departure, GM Pierre Gauthier announced the appointment of Randy Cunneyworth and Randy Ladouceur as assistant coaches. Cunneyworth and Ladouceur were coach and assistant coach respectfully for the Canadiens's AHL affiliate, the Hamilton Bulldogs, during the previous season. The addition of Ladouceur also provides the team the first former defenceman as an assistant coach since the 2005–06 season.

Season timeline

October

The Canadiens started with the team's worst start since 1941. Prior to their first game of the season, defenceman Andrei Markov was placed on the injured reserved list. The Canadiens started the season with a 2–0 loss to the Toronto Maple Leafs at the Air Canada Centre. During the game, newly acquired defenceman Chris Campoli suffered a hamstring injury and was sidelined indefinitely.

The team's first win of the season was a 5–1 decision against the Winnipeg Jets at the MTS Centre, which was the Jets' first game in the newly relocated franchise's history.

The Canadiens played their home opener on October 13 in a 4–1 loss to the Calgary Flames. This coincided with Lars Eller's first game of the season following off-season shoulder surgery. That same day, the team announced that forward Ryan White had surgery for a sports hernia and would be sidelined indefinitely.

On October 23, the team traded long-time prospect Brock Trotter and their seventh round pick in the 2012 NHL Entry Draft to the Phoenix Coyotes for forward Petteri Nokelainen and defenceman Garrett Stafford.

The team would go on to a six-game losing streak and five-game losing streak at home until defeating the Philadelphia Flyers 5–1 on October 26, 2011, at the Bell Centre. Prior to the game, the Canadiens relieved Assistant Coach Perry Pearn of his duties, offering him another position in the organization, which he declined. Pearn was replaced behind the bench by Randy Ladouceur, who until then was situated in the press box during game time.

November

On November 10, the Canadiens beat the Phoenix Coyotes 3–2 in overtime to continue their winning streak in Phoenix. The Coyotes have not beaten the Canadiens at home ice since December 9, 1998, when they won 4–2.

Carey Price recorded back-to-back shutouts for the first time of his career in duplicate 4–0 wins against the Carolina Hurricanes on November 16 and the New York Rangers on November 19.

Max Pacioretty was suspended by NHL disciplinarian Brendan Shanahan for three games following a questionable hit on Pittsburgh Penguins defenceman Kris Letang on November 26 at the Bell Centre. Letang suffered a broken nose but still managed to finish the game. No penalty had been called on the hit.

The month also saw the NHL debuts of defenceman Frederic St. Denis on November 16 in a 4–0 win against the Carolina Hurricanes and Louis Leblanc on November 30 in a 4–1 loss to the Anaheim Ducks.

December

In an effort to bolster their power play, which was ranked 29th out of 30 teams in the league, GM Pierre Gauthier acquired defenceman Tomas Kaberle from the Carolina Hurricanes on December 9 in exchange for defenceman Jaroslav Spacek. In his first game with the Canadiens, Kaberle registered two assists, including one on the power play, in a 2–1 road win against the New Jersey Devils.

Chris Campoli returned to action on December 13 against the New York Islanders. He was sidelined with a lower body injury suffered during the team's season opener against the Toronto Maple Leafs back on October 6.

Feeling that the team was under performing with its 13–12–7 losing record, Pierre Gauthier fired Head Coach Jacques Martin on December 17. Assistant Coach Randy Cunneyworth was named interim head coach. Cunneyworth became the first unilingual, English-speaking active head coach of the Canadiens since Bob Berry, who was head coach from 1981 to 1984. Assistant general manager Larry Carriere was named assistant coach in a questionable move, as Carriere has never coached hockey at any level whatsoever. Cunneyworth's first game as the interim head coach resulted in a 5–3 loss against the New Jersey Devils at the Bell Centre on December 17.

Under interim coach Cunneyworth, the team embarked on a five-game losing skid until finally winning their first game under their new coach in a convincing 6–2 win against the Senators in Ottawa on December 27. Despite this win, the team dropped their next two games and closed off the month losing 7 of their last 8 games.

January

Lars Eller started off the new year in style on January 4 by scoring four goals (three in the third period alone) to help his team pounce the Winnipeg Jets 7–3 at the Bell Centre. Eller becomes the first Canadiens player to score four goals in one game since Jan Bulis did so against the Philadelphia Flyers back on January 26, 2006.

On January 12, goaltender Carey Price was invited to the 2012 NHL All-Star Game, which was played on January 29 in Ottawa. He was accompanied by teammate Raphael Diaz, who participated in the rookie skills competition held on January 28.

One day after Michael Cammalleri made disparaging remarks about the current status of the Montreal Canadiens, the Habs decided to part ways with the veteran forward. On January 12, Cammalleri was pulled out of a game against the Boston Bruins to find out that he had been traded to the Calgary Flames, along with goaltender Karri Ramo and a fifth round pick in 2012. In exchange, Montreal received forwards Rene Bourque, Patrick Holland and a second-round pick in 2013. Bourque carried a salary cap hit of $3.3 million until the 2015–16 season. This is Cammalleri's second tenure with the Flames, where he scored 39 goals during the 2008–09 season.

February

Max Pacioretty scored the first hat-trick of his career in a 4–2 win against the New York Islanders on February 9.

After being sidelined since the beginning of the season with a sports hernia, Ryan White finally made his season debut on February 15 against the Boston Bruins at the Bell Centre.

With their playoff hopes dying with each passing day, Pierre Gauthier became a seller. On February 17, Montreal sent defenceman Hal Gill and a conditional 2013 fifth-round draft pick to the Nashville Predators for a 2012 second-round pick, prospect Robert Slaney and Blake Geoffrion, the grandson of former Habs great Bernard Geoffrion and great-grandson of Canadiens legend Howie Morenz.

During the trade deadline on February 27, the Canadiens reacquired their fifth-round conditional pick in the Hall Gill trade, as well as the Predators' second-round pick in 2013 for forward Andrei Kostitsyn. They also claimed via re-entry waivers enforcer Brad Staubitz from the Minnesota Wild. Despite rumors to the contrary, Travis Moen and Chris Campoli, who were set to both become unrestricted free agents at the end of season, were not moved.

The Canadiens finished the month losing seven of their last eight games, including a five-game losing streak.

March and April

Max Pacioretty became the first American-born player in Canadiens history to reach the 30 goal mark during a 5–4 victory on March 8 against the Edmonton Oilers.

March 10 saw the return of defenceman Andrei Markov to the line-up. He registered an assist in the Canadiens 4–1 win against the Vancouver Canucks. Markov, who had been sidelined with a torn ACL, played his first game since November 13, 2010, missing almost 16 months of action.

Erik Cole scored a natural hat-trick just 5:41 after the opening faceoff on March 24 when the Habs defeated the Ottawa Senators 5–1. In turn, Cole became the second American-born player in Canadiens history to reach the 30-goal plateau. His effort also set a team record for the fastest natural hat-trick to start a game by any Canadiens player. Cole finished the season with a record-high 35 goals for an American-born player.

The Canadiens were officially eliminated from playoff contention in their 76th game of the season following a 4–1 loss to the Philadelphia Flyers on March 24.

On March 29, team owner Geoff Molson officially relieved Pierre Gauthier of his duties as general manager. Bob Gainey was also let go of his duties as special advisor to the GM. Molson further announced that former Habs GM Serge Savard would be acting as special advisor to find the next general manager.

April 1 saw the NHL debut of Gabriel Dumont in a winning cause against the Tampa Bay Lightning.

Playoffs
The Canadiens missed the Stanley Cup playoffs for the first time since 2007.

Standings

Schedule and results

Pre-season 

|- style="background:#fbb;"
| 1 || September 20 || Dallas Stars || 3–6 || Price || Montreal || 21,273 || 0–1–0 ||
|- style="background:#fbb;"
| 2 || September 21 || Buffalo Sabres || 1–3 || Mayer || Montreal || 21,273 || 0–2–0 ||
|- style="background:#cfc;"
| 3 || September 23 || Ottawa Senators  || 4–3 SO || Lawson || Ottawa || 17,853 || 1–2–0 || 
|- style="background:#fbb;"
| 4 || September 24 || Ottawa Senators || 2–3 || Price || Montreal || 21,273 || 1–3–0 ||
|- style="background:#fbb;"
| 5 || September 25 || Boston Bruins || 3–7 || Budaj || Halifax || 10,595 || 1–4–0 ||
|- style="background:#fbb;"
| 6 || September 26 || Boston Bruins || 1–2 || Price || Montreal || 21,273 || 1–5–0 ||
|- style="background:#fbb;"
| 7 || September 29 || Tampa Bay Lightning || 0–4 || Budaj || Montreal || 21,273 || 1–6–0 ||
|- style="background:#cfc;"
| 8 || October 1 || Tampa Bay Lightning || 5–1  || Price || Quebec City || 15,176 || 2–6–0  ||
|-

Regular season 

|-  style="text-align:center; background:#fcc;"
| 1 || October 6 || @ Toronto Maple Leafs || 0–2 || Price || Air Canada Centre || 19,606 || 0–1–0 || 0 ||
|-  style="text-align:center; background:#cfc;"
| 2 || October 9 || @ Winnipeg Jets || 5–1 || Price || MTS Centre || 15,004|| 1–1–0 || 2 ||
|-  style="text-align:center; background:#fcc;"
| 3 || October 13 || Calgary Flames || 1–4 || Price  || Bell Centre || 21,273 || 1–2–0  || 2 ||
|- style="background: #e1e1e1;"
| 4 || October 15 || Colorado Avalanche || 5–6 SO || Price  || Bell Centre || 21,273 || 1–2–1 || 3 ||
|-  style="text-align:center; background:#fcc;"
| 5 || October 18 || Buffalo Sabres || 1–3 || Price || Bell Centre || 21,273 || 1–3–1 || 3 ||
|-  style="text-align:center; background:#fcc;"
| 6 || October 20 || @ Pittsburgh Penguins || 1–3 || Price || Consol Energy Center || 18,403 || 1–4–1 || 3 ||
|- style="background: #e1e1e1;"
| 7 || October 22 || Toronto Maple Leafs || 4–5 OT || Price || Bell Centre || 21,273  || 1–4–2  || 4 ||
|-  style="text-align:center; background:#fcc;"
| 8 || October 24 || Florida Panthers || 1–2 || Budaj || Bell Centre || 21,273 || 1–5–2 || 4 ||
|-  style="text-align:center; background:#cfc;"
| 9 || October 26 || Philadelphia Flyers || 5–1 || Price  || Bell Centre || 21,273 || 2–5–2 || 6 ||
|-  style="text-align:center; background:#cfc;"
| 10 || October 27 || @ Boston Bruins || 2–1 || Price || TD Garden || 17,565 || 3–5–2 || 8 ||
|-  style="text-align:center; background:#cfc;"
| 11 || October 29 || Boston Bruins || 4–2 || Price  || Bell Centre || 21,273 || 4–5–2 || 10 ||
|-

|-  style="text-align:center; background:#cfc;"
| 12 || November 4 || @ Ottawa Senators || 2–1  || Price || Scotiabank Place || 20,329 || 5–5–2 || 12 ||
|-  style="text-align:center; background:#fcc;"
| 13 || November 5 || @ New York Rangers || 3–5 || Price || Madison Square Garden || 18,200 || 5–6–2  || 12 ||
|-  style="text-align:center; background:#fcc;"
| 14 || November 8 || Edmonton Oilers || 1–3 || Price || Bell Centre || 21,273 || 5–7–2 || 12 ||
|-  style="text-align:center; background:#cfc;"
| 15 || November 10 || @ Phoenix Coyotes || 3–2 OT || Price || Jobing.com Arena || 14,138 || 6–7–2 || 14 ||
|-  style="text-align:center; background:#cfc;"
| 16 || November 12 || @ Nashville Predators || 2–1 OT  || Budaj || Bridgestone Arena || 17,113 || 7–7–2 || 16 ||
|- style="background: #e1e1e1;"
| 17 || November 14 || Buffalo Sabres || 2–3 SO || Price || Bell Centre || 21,273 || 7–7–3 || 17 ||
|-  style="text-align:center; background:#cfc;"
| 18 || November 16 || Carolina Hurricanes || 4–0 || Price || Bell Centre || 21,273 || 8–7–3 || 19 ||
|-  style="text-align:center; background:#fcc;"
| 19 || November 17 || @ New York Islanders || 3–4 || Budaj || Nassau Coliseum || 9928 || 8–8–3  || 19 ||
|-  style="text-align:center; background:#cfc;"
| 20 || November 19 || New York Rangers || 4–0 || Price || Bell Centre || 21,273  || 9–8–3 || 21 ||
|-  style="text-align:center; background:#fcc;"
| 21 || November 21 || Boston Bruins || 0–1 || Price || Bell Centre || 21,273 || 9–9–3 || 21 ||
|-  style="text-align:center; background:#cfc;"
| 22 || November 23 || @ Carolina Hurricanes || 4–3 SO || Price || RBC Center || 14,862 || 10–9–3 || 23 ||
|-  style="text-align:center; background:#fcc;"
| 23 || November 25 || @ Philadelphia Flyers || 1–3 || Price || Wells Fargo Center || 19,991 || 10–10–3 || 23 ||
|- style="background: #e1e1e1;"
| 24 || November 26 || Pittsburgh Penguins || 3–4 OT || Price || Bell Centre || 21,273 || 10–10–4 || 24 ||
|-  style="text-align:center; background:#fcc;"
| 25 || November 30 || @ Anaheim Ducks || 1–4 || Budaj || Honda Center || 13,237 || 10–11–4 || 24 ||
|-

|- style="background: #e1e1e1;"
| 26 || December 1 || @ San Jose Sharks || 3–4 SO || Price || HP Pavilion || 17,562 || 10–11–5 || 25 ||
|-  style="text-align:center; background:#cfc;"
| 27 || December 3 || @ Los Angeles Kings || 2–1 || Price || Staples Center || 18,118 || 11–11–5 || 27 ||
|- style="background: #e1e1e1;"
| 28 || December 6 || Columbus Blue Jackets || 2–3 SO  || Price || Bell Centre || 21,273 || 11–11–6 || 28 ||
|- style="background: #e1e1e1;"
| 29 || December 8 || Vancouver Canucks || 3–4 SO || Price || Bell Centre || 21,273 || 11–11–7 || 29 ||
|-  style="text-align:center; background:#cfc;"
| 30 || December 10 || @ New Jersey Devils || 2–1  || Price || Prudential Center || 14,210 || 12–11–7  || 31 ||
|-  style="text-align:center; background:#cfc;"
| 31 || December 13 || New York Islanders || 5–3 || Price || Bell Centre || 21,273 || 13–11–7  || 33 ||
|-  style="text-align:center; background:#fcc;"
| 32 || December 15 || Philadelphia Flyers || 3–4 || Price || Bell Centre || 21,273 || 13–12–7 || 33 ||
|-  style="text-align:center; background:#fcc;"
| 33 || December 17 || New Jersey Devils || 3–5 || Price || Bell Centre || 21,273 || 13–13–7 || 33 ||
|-  style="text-align:center; background:#fcc;"
| 34 || December 19 || @ Boston Bruins || 2–3 || Price || TD Garden || 17,565 || 13–14–7 || 33 ||
|-  style="text-align:center; background:#fcc;"
| 35 || December 21 || @ Chicago Blackhawks || 1–5 || Budaj || United Center || 22,081 || 13–15–7 || 33  ||
|-  style="text-align:center; background:#fcc;"
| 36 || December 22 || @ Winnipeg Jets || 0–4 || Price || MTS Centre || 15,004 || 13–16–7 || 33 ||
|-  style="text-align:center; background:#cfc;"
| 37 || December 27 || @ Ottawa Senators || 6–2 || Price || Scotiabank Place || 20,500 || 14–16–7 || 35 ||
|-  style="text-align:center; background:#fcc;"
| 38 || December 29 || @ Tampa Bay Lightning || 3–4 || Price || St. Pete Times Forum || 19,204 || 14–17–7 || 35 ||
|-  style="text-align:center; background:#fcc;"
| 39 || December 31 || @ Florida Panthers || 2–3 || Price || BankAtlantic Center || 20,098 || 14–18–7 || 35 ||
|-

|-  style="text-align:center; background:#cfc;"
| 40 || January 4 || Winnipeg Jets || 7–3 || Price || Bell Centre || 21,273 || 15–18–7 || 37 ||
|-  style="text-align:center; background:#cfc;"
| 41 || January 7 || Tampa Bay Lightning || 3–1 || Price || Bell Centre || 21,273 || 16–18–7 || 39 ||
|-  style="text-align:center; background:#fcc;"
| 42 || January 10 || St. Louis Blues || 0–3 || Price || Bell Centre || 21,273 || 16–19–7 || 39 ||
|-  style="text-align:center; background:#fcc;"
| 43 || January 12 || @ Boston Bruins || 1–2 || Price || TD Garden || 17,565 || 16–20–7 || 39 ||
|- style="background: #e1e1e1;"
| 44 || January 14 || Ottawa Senators || 2–3 SO || Price || Bell Centre || 21,273  || 16–20–8 || 40 ||
|-  style="text-align:center; background:#cfc;"
| 45 || January 15 || New York Rangers || 4–1 || Budaj || Bell Centre || 21,273 || 17–20–8 || 42 ||
|-  style="text-align:center; background:#fcc;"
| 46 || January 18 || Washington Capitals || 0–3 || Price || Bell Centre || 21,273 || 17–21–8 || 42 ||
|- style="background: #e1e1e1;"
| 47 || January 20 || @ Pittsburgh Penguins || 4–5 SO || Budaj || Consol Energy Center || 18,588 || 17–21–9 || 43 ||
|-  style="text-align:center; background:#cfc;"
| 48 || January 21 || @ Toronto Maple Leafs || 3–1 || Price || Air Canada Centre || 19,643 || 18–21–9 || 45 ||
|-  style="text-align:center; background:#cfc;"
| 49 || January 25 || Detroit Red Wings || 7–2 || Price || Bell Centre || 21,273 || 19–21–9 || 47 ||
|-  style="text-align:center; background:#fcc;"
| 50 || January 31 || Buffalo Sabres || 1–3 || Price || Bell Centre || 21,273 || 19–22–9 || 47 ||
|-

|-  style="text-align:center; background:#fcc;"
| 51 || February 2 || @ New Jersey Devils || 3–5 || Price || Prudential Center || 13,283 || 19–23–9 || 47 ||
|-  style="text-align:center; background:#fcc;"
| 52 || February 4 || Washington Capitals || 0–3 || Budaj || Bell Centre || 21,273 || 19–24–9 || 47 ||
|-  style="text-align:center; background:#cfc;"
| 53 || February 5 || Winnipeg Jets || 3–0 || Price || Bell Centre || 21,273 || 20–24–9 || 49 ||
|-  style="text-align:center; background:#cfc;"
| 54 || February 7 || Pittsburgh Penguins || 3–2 SO || Price || Bell Centre || 21,273 || 21–24–9  || 51 ||
|-  style="text-align:center; background:#cfc;"
| 55 || February 9 || @ New York Islanders || 4–2 || Price || Nassau Coliseum || 12,312 || 22–24–9 || 53 ||
|-  style="text-align:center; background:#cfc;"
| 56 || February 11 || @ Toronto Maple Leafs || 5–0 || Price || Air Canada Centre || 19,685 || 23–24–9 || 55 ||
|-  style="text-align:center; background:#fcc;"
| 57 || February 13 || Carolina Hurricanes || 3–5 || Price || Bell Centre || 21,273 || 23–25–9 || 55 ||
|- style="background: #e1e1e1;"
| 58 || February 15 || Boston Bruins || 3–4 SO || Price || Bell Centre || 21,273 || 23–25–10 || 56  ||
|-  style="text-align:center; background:#cfc;"
| 59 || February 17 || @ Buffalo Sabres || 4–3 SO || Price || First Niagara Center || 18,690 || 24–25–10 || 58 ||
|-  style="text-align:center; background:#fcc;"
| 60 || February 19 || New Jersey Devils || 1–3 || Price || Bell Centre || 21,273 || 24–26–10 || 58 ||
|-  style="text-align:center; background:#fcc;"
| 61 || February 21 || Dallas Stars || 0–3 || Price || Bell Centre || 21,273 || 24–27–10 || 58 ||
|-  style="text-align:center; background:#fcc;"
| 62 || February 24 || @ Washington Capitals || 1–4 || Price || Verizon Center || 18,506 || 24–28–10 || 58 ||
|-  style="text-align:center; background:#fcc;"
| 63 || February 26 || @ Florida Panthers || 2–4 || Budaj || BankAtlantic Center || 18,108 ||  24–29–10 || 58 ||
|-  style="text-align:center; background:#fcc;"
| 64 || February 28 || @ Tampa Bay Lightning || 1–2 || Price || St. Pete Times Forum || 18,878  || 24–30–10 || 58 ||
|-

|-  style="text-align:center; background:#cfc;"
| 65 || March 1 || Minnesota Wild || 5–4 SO || Price || Bell Centre || 21,273 || 25–30–10 || 60 ||
|-  style="text-align:center; background:#fcc;"
| 66 || March 3 || Toronto Maple Leafs || 1–3 || Price || Bell Centre || 21,273 || 25–31–10 || 60 ||
|-  style="text-align:center; background:#fcc;"
| 67 || March 6 || @ Calgary Flames || 4–5 || Price || Scotiabank Saddledome || 19,289 || 25–32–10  || 60 ||
|-  style="text-align:center; background:#cfc;"
| 68 || March 8 || @ Edmonton Oilers || 5–3 || Budaj || Rexall Place || 16,839 || 26–32–10 || 62 ||
|-  style="text-align:center; background:#cfc;"
| 69 || March 10 || @ Vancouver Canucks || 4–1 || Price || Rogers Arena || 18,890 || 27–32–10 || 64 ||
|- style="background: #e1e1e1;"
| 70 || March 12 || @ Buffalo Sabres || 3–4 OT || Budaj || First Niagara Center || 18,690 || 27–32–11  || 65 ||
|-  style="text-align:center; background:#cfc;"
| 71 || March 14 || Ottawa Senators || 3–2 SO || Price || Bell Centre || 21,273 || 28–32–11 || 67 ||
|- style="background: #e1e1e1;"
| 72 || March 16 || @ Ottawa Senators || 1–2 OT || Price || Scotiabank Place || 20,500 || 28–32–12  || 68 ||
|- style="background: #e1e1e1;"
| 73 || March 17 || New York Islanders || 2–3 SO || Budaj || Bell Centre || 21,273 || 28–32–13 || 69  ||
|-  style="text-align:center; background:#fcc;"
| 74 || March 21 || @ Buffalo Sabres || 0–3 || Price || First Niagara Center || 18,690 || 28–33–13 || 69 ||
|-  style="text-align:center; background:#cfc;"
| 75 || March 23 || Ottawa Senators || 5–1 || Price  || Bell Centre || 21,273 || 29–33–13 || 71 ||
|-  style="text-align:center; background:#fcc;"
| 76 || March 24 || @ Philadelphia Flyers || 1–4 || Budaj || Wells Fargo Center || 19,931  || 29–34–13 || 71 ||
|- style="background: #e1e1e1;"
| 77 || March 27 || Florida Panthers || 2–3 SO || Price || Bell Centre || 21,273 || 29–34–14 || 72 ||
|-  style="text-align:center; background:#fcc;"
| 78 || March 30 || @ New York Rangers || 1–4 || Price || Madison Square Garden || 18,200 || 29–35–14 || 72 ||
|- style="background: #e1e1e1;"
| 79 || March 31 || @ Washington Capitals || 2–3 SO || Budaj || Verizon Center || 18,506 || 29–35–15 || 73 ||
|-

|-  style="text-align:center; background:#cfc;"
| 80 || April 4 || Tampa Bay Lightning || 5–2 || Budaj || Bell Centre || 21,273 || 30–35–15 || 75 ||
|- style="background: #e1e1e1;"
| 81 || April 5 || @ Carolina Hurricanes || 1–2 (SO) || Budaj || RBC Center || 17,836 || 30–35–16 || 76 ||
|-  style="text-align:center; background:#cfc;"
| 82 || April 7 || Toronto Maple Leafs || 4–1 || Budaj || Bell Centre || 21,273 || 31–35–16 || 78 ||
|-

|Legend:

Player statistics

Skaters

Goaltenders

†Denotes player spent time with another team before joining Canadiens. Stats reflect time with Canadiens only.
‡Traded mid-season. Stats reflect time with Canadiens only.

Awards and records

Awards

Milestones

Transactions 
The Canadiens have been involved in the following transactions during the 2011–12 season:

Trades

Free agents acquired

Free agents lost

Claimed via waivers 

+On October 9, NHL commissioner Gary Bettman allowed the Montreal Canadiens to cancel the waiver claim on Betts and return him to the Philadelphia Flyers, as he had failed a physical due to an undisclosed injury which he had prior to being claimed.

Lost via waivers

Player signings

Draft picks 

Montreal's picks at the 2011 NHL Entry Draft in St. Paul, Minnesota.

See also 
 2011–12 NHL season

References

Montreal Canadiens seasons
Montreal Canadiens season, 2011-12
Montreal